The Africa Women's Handball Championship for Clubs Champions is an annual international women's handball club competition run by the African Handball Confederation. The top club sides from Africa's women's handball leagues are invited to participate in this competition.

Summary 

 Air Afrique Bouaké was the only contestant.
 A round-robin tournament determined the final standings.

Winners by club

Rq
GS Pétroliers (ex. MC Alger HB)

Winners by country

Participation details 2000–

Participation details 1979–1999

See also
 African Women's Handball Cup Winners' Cup
 African Women's Handball Super Cup
 African Women's Handball Championship

References

External links
 Tournament profile at goalzz.com
 Men's & Women's Champions League history - cahbonline

 
African handball club competitions
African Handball Confederation competitions
Women's sports competitions in Africa
Multi-national professional sports leagues